John P. Nallen (1932 – 4 January 2019) was an Irish Gaelic footballer who played for club sides Crossmolina, Tuam Stars, Trim and Castlerahan and at inter-county level with the Mayo, Meath, Galway and Cavan senior teams.

Honours

Tuam Stars
Galway Senior Football Championship (8): 1952, 1954, 1955, 1956, 1957, 1958, 1959, 1960

Trim
Meath Senior Football Championship (1): 1962

Castlerahan
Cavan Intermediate Football Championship (1): 1966
Cavan Junior Football Championship (1): 1965

Mayo
Connacht Senior Football Championship (3): 1955, 1959, 1960
National Football League (1): 1953-54
All-Ireland Junior Football Championship (1): 1950
Connacht Junior Football Championship (1): 1950
Connacht Minor Football Championship (1): 1950

References

1932 births
2019 deaths
Gaelic football forwards
Crossmolina Gaelic footballers
Tuam Stars Gaelic footballers
Trim Gaelic footballers
Castlerahan Gaelic footballers
Mayo inter-county Gaelic footballers
Galway inter-county Gaelic footballers
Meath inter-county Gaelic footballers
Cavan inter-county Gaelic footballers
Connacht inter-provincial Gaelic footballers